The AV Leichtflugzeuge Vagabund is a German ultralight aircraft that was designed by Birk Meier, Hans Grannemann and Robert Kaps and produced by AV Leichtflugzeuge of Haren, Germany. The aircraft is supplied as a kit or plans for amateur construction or as a complete ready-to-fly-aircraft.

The design was marketed in the 1990s by Aircraft Coverings of Bad Essen, Germany.

Design and development
The Vagabund was designed to comply with the Fédération Aéronautique Internationale microlight rules. It features a strut-braced biplane layout, a two-seats-in-tandem open cockpit, fixed conventional landing gear and a single engine in tractor configuration. The aircraft closely resembles the 1930s Bücker Bü 131.

The aircraft is made from Polish pine, with its flying surfaces covered in doped aircraft fabric. Its  span wing employs ailerons on the lower wing only. The  Rotax 912UL, the   Jabiru 2200 and the  Limbach L2000 Volkswagen air-cooled engine have been fitted, along with automotive conversions such as the Nissan 1.2 litre engine.

Specifications (Vagabund)

References

External links

1990s German ultralight aircraft
Homebuilt aircraft
Single-engined tractor aircraft